Mary Carlisle (born Gwendolyn Witter; February 3, 1914 – August 1, 2018) was an American actress, singer, and dancer, best known for her roles as a wholesome ingénue in numerous 1930s musical-comedy films.

She starred in more than 60 Hollywood films, moving beyond bit parts after coming to attention, alongside the likes of Gloria Stuart and Ginger Rogers, as one of 15 girls selected by the Western Association of Motion pictures as their WAMPAS Baby Stars in 1932. Her first major role was in the 1933 film College Humor with Bing Crosby. The two performers worked together in two additional films, Double or Nothing (1937) and Doctor Rhythm (1938). After her marriage in 1942 and a starring role in Dead Men Walk (1943), she retired from acting.

Early life
Carlisle was born Gwendolyn Witter in Boston, Massachusetts, to Arthur William and Leona Ella (Wotton) Witter. Born into a religious family, she was educated in a convent in Back Bay, Boston, after her family moved to that neighborhood when she was six months old.

Some time after her father's death, when she was 4, Carlisle and her mother relocated to Los Angeles. Through her uncle Robert Carlisle, who was a film editor and producer, she learned of a casting call at Metro-Goldwyn-Mayer.

Hollywood career

Carlisle's uncle, who lived in California, gave Carlisle the opportunity to appear in the Jackie Coogan silent movie Long Live the King in 1923, a performance for which she was uncredited.  Carlisle was discovered by studio executive Carl Laemmle Jr. at the age of 14 while she was eating lunch with her mother at the Universal Studios canteen. She was praised for her angelic looks, and Laemmle offered her a screen test. Though she passed the test and started doing extra work at Universal, she was stopped by a welfare officer who noticed that she was underage and had to finish school first.

After completing her education two years later, she headed to MGM. Carlisle, who had lied about her dancing ability, took a one-day basic tap-dancing lesson, won a part along with future star Ann Dvorak, and appeared briefly in one film. Carlisle signed a one-year contract with MGM in 1930, and was used as a back-up dancer. At the start of her movie career, Carlisle had small parts in movies such as Madam Satan and Passion Flower (both 1930). She also had a role in Grand Hotel (1932), as a bride named Mrs. Hoffman. She gained recognition when, in 1932, she was selected as one of the WAMPAS Baby Stars (young actresses believed to be on their way to stardom).

Her major acting break came when Paramount Pictures "loaned" her out to star in the musical comedy College Humor (1933) alongside Bing Crosby. (In the Hollywood "star system", stars could not work for companies other than the one to which they were contracted.) The performance was well regarded by critics, and catapulted Carlisle to leading-actress status. She made two more movies with Crosby, Double or Nothing in 1937, and Doctor Rhythm (1938). She continued working for different studios, mainly in B-movies as a leading lady. One of Carlisle's few appearances in an A-movie was in Dance, Girl, Dance (1940), opposite Lucille Ball and Maureen O'Hara. B

She acted in more than 60 movies in a career that spanned about a dozen years, and retired after co-starring as the doctor's wife in Dead Men Walk (1943).

Personal life
In 1942, Carlisle married British-born actor James Edward Blakeley, who later became an executive producer at 20th Century Fox. She retired from films shortly after. The couple had one son, James, and two grandchildren during their nearly 65-year marriage. In later life, Carlisle was the manager of the Elizabeth Arden Salon in Beverly Hills, California.

A Democrat, she supported Adlai Stevenson during the 1952 presidential election.

After the death of Barbara Kent at age 103 in 2011, Carlisle became the last surviving WAMPAS Baby Star. She died on August 1, 2018, at the Motion Picture & Television Fund, a retirement community for actors in Woodland Hills, Los Angeles; no cause of death was reported. She was believed to be 104, but never personally confirmed her age or birth date during her life. Carlisle is buried in Westwood Memorial Park in Los Angeles, California.

Her mother's twin sister, Leotta Whytock, was a film editor.

Accolades
On February 8, 1960, Carlisle received a star on the Hollywood Walk of Fame, at 6679 Hollywood Boulevard.

Filmography

References

External links

 
 
 
 
 Photographs of Mary Carlisle

1914 births
2018 deaths
20th-century American actresses
Actresses from Boston
American centenarians
American child actresses
American film actresses
American silent film actresses
Burials at Westwood Village Memorial Park Cemetery
California Democrats
Massachusetts Democrats
Metro-Goldwyn-Mayer contract players
WAMPAS Baby Stars
Women centenarians
21st-century American women